Regional sports network (RSN) in the United States and Canada is a cable television channel (many of which are also distributed on direct broadcast satellite services) that presents sports programming to a local market or geographical region.

Historically, some RSNs originated as premium channels; since the 1990s, however, they have commonly been distributed through the expanded basic-programming tiers of cable and IPTV services, packaged alongside other national basic cable networks, and local broadcast stations and public, educational, and government access channels. Satellite providers often require subscribers to purchase a higher programming tier or a specialized sports tier to receive local and out-of-market regional sports networks.

Overview
The most important programming on a regional sports network (RSN) consists of live broadcasts of professional and collegiate sporting events, as those games generate an overwhelming percentage of an RSN's advertising income, in addition to viewership. During the rest of the day, these channels show other sports and recreation programming (such as news programs covering local and national sports; magazine and discussion programs relating to a team or collegiate conference; fishing and hunting programs; and in-studio video simulcasts of sports radio programs); rebroadcasts of sports events that aired as late as the day prior and paid programming may also be shown. These channels are often the source content for out-of-market sports packages. In the United States, DirecTV offers all regional sports networks to all subscribers across the country, however games and select programming is blacked out outside their home markets.

Regional sports networks are generally among the most expensive channels carried by cable television providers, due to the expense of rights to the local sports they carry; these higher subscriber fees received by television providers through retransmission consent carriage agreements coupled with percentages of other forms of revenue are used to pay local and regional teams for the right to broadcast their games. A typical RSN, carries a monthly retransmission fee of $2 to $3 per subscriber, lower than the rates providers charge to carry ESPN and premium channels but higher than the rates for other cable networks. These high prices are supported by demand for the often-popular local sports teams they carry (particularly those that are member franchises of larger sports leagues such as Major League Baseball, the National Basketball Association and the National Hockey League, as well as college teams that have large and loyal fanbases); carriage disputes between distributors and RSNs are often controversial and protracted. The expense of the per subscriber rate led some major providers such as Charter Spectrum and Verizon FiOS to begin incorporating a fixed "regional sports network fee" as a separate surcharge within its billing statements as early as 2013.

Most regional sports networks in the United States are either affiliated with Bally Sports or the NBC Sports Regional Networks, which produce and distribute supplementary programming – including professional and college sports events involving out-of-market teams, and sports-centered reality and documentary series – for their individual owned-and-operated member networks and any RSNs not under common ownership that receive their "nationally" distributed programming through affiliation agreements. in the past, some RSNs also carried supplemental programming from networks such as America One, AMGTV or ESPNews, though vertical integration and the impact of streaming services removing game broadcasts from low-tier broadcast networks has effectively ended this practice.

In Canada, Sportsnet operates four regional sports networks, and the otherwise nationally distributed TSN also maintains some regional operations. This differs from the operational structure of RSNs in the United States, which are independently operated from national sports networks.

An increasing trend is for the teams whose games make up the lucrative programming to own the RSN themselves. This serves two purposes: first, the teams make more money operating an RSN than they would collecting a licensing fee from an individual network or a group, such as Bally Sports. Second, by owning their own RSN, teams that must share revenues with other members of their league can mask its broadcast-related profits. Under the old model, a team collects a large fee for licensing its games to the RSN. That fee would then be disclosed and shared with the other teams in the league. Under the new, team-owned RSN model, the team demands only a nominal fee, so the profits for local broadcasts stay with the team. The owned-and-operated RSN model generally works best in the largest markets where advertising and cable revenue is larger; in smaller or fringe markets, the sale of rights fees is more lucrative.

For example, the New York Rangers and New York Knicks have long co-owned their RSN, MSG; however, they also have purchased the rights to their rivals, the New York Islanders and New Jersey Devils. MSG also owns the rights to the Buffalo Sabres, however the team and ownership controls game production and that has since evolved into a separate MSG sub-channel for the Sabres market called MSG Western New York which is dual-controlled and programmed by MSG and Pegula Sports and Entertainment, owners of the Sabres effectively making it an owned and operated RSN. The Sabres had moved to MSG after the closure of their former home, Empire Sports Network, in the wake of the financial collapse of its owner Adelphia Communications Corporation.

History

The first regional sports network is considered to be the Madison Square Garden Network. An early unnamed version of that network started broadcasting Knicks and Rangers to a small number of subscribers in Manhattan in May 1969. By the late 1970s another version of this network would launch and be made available to other cable systems in the metropolitan area and it would finally receive the name Madison Square Garden Television in 1980. Another early network considered by many to be an RSN is Philadelphia's PRISM which launched in 1976 offering coverage of three of the city's major sports teams and movies.

In 1976, Cablevision launched a new service providing coverage of Long Island sports (originally called Cablevision Sports 3). This channel would be renamed SportsChannel New York in 1979 and became the first channel to resemble a modern regional sports network. Other SportsChannels were launched in different cities and in 1988, they were formally organized into a group that shared programming and national TV rights.

United States

Bally Sports

For years, the default RSN for many markets was owned by Fox Sports. Fox Sports Networks, which launched on November 1, 1996, as Fox Sports Net, was created through former parent News Corporation's October 1995 purchase of a 50% equity stake in Liberty Media-owned Prime Sports Networks, co-founded in 1988 by Bill Daniels and Liberty's then-sister company Tele-Communications Inc. The group expanded further in June 1997, Fox/Liberty Networks, the joint venture company operated by News Corporation and Liberty Media, purchased a 40% interest in the Cablevision-owned SportsChannel group.

As part of a rebranding effort, the collective branding of the networks – which eventually became "FSN (Region/City)" in 2004 – was extended to Fox Sports (Region/City) (also used from 1996 to 2000) with the start of the 2008 college football season. The FSN networks were acquired by Diamond Sports Group from The Walt Disney Company in 2019, as Disney was required to divest them by U.S. Department of Justice as a condition of their own acquisition of 21st Century Fox. The channel group was renamed Bally Sports on March 31, 2021, as part of a naming rights agreement with casino operator Bally's Corporation. The networks that currently maintain affiliations with or are owned by Bally Sports, and the major teams and athletic conferences the regional networks broadcast are as follows:

Current owned-and-operated outlets

Current affiliates

NBC Sports Regional Networks

Seeing an opportunity to serve sports fans on a more local level and generate profits, cable conglomerate Comcast began creating their own RSN – Comcast SportsNet (CSN) – in the late 1990s. The groundwork of this group was laid as a result of Comcast's March 1996 purchase of 66% equity in Philadelphia-based event organizer Spectacor, automatically giving it ownership of its two professional team franchises; this led to the creation of Comcast SportsNet Philadelphia, which launched on October 1, 1997.

Ironically, CSN would purchase a small number of RSNs previously owned by Fox Sports Networks, and acquired the local rights to professional teams that FSN regional networks carried (in two markets, the latter situation resulted in Fox Sports shutting down their networks). The January 2011 Comcast merger with NBCUniversal allowed NBC Sports to take operational control of these networks and they are expected to become more integrated with their sister national sports network, NBCSN.

In April 2017, Comcast SportsNet's California and Bay Area networks were rebranded under the NBC Sports brand; NBC Sports Regional Networks adopted the "NBC Sports" moniker on its other regional channels on October 2, 2017.

AT&T Sports Networks

In May 2009, DirecTV Group Inc. announced that it would become a part of Liberty Media's entertainment unit, with some of the group's assets subsequently being spun off as a separate company under the DirecTV banner; the Fox Sports Networks outlets that became part of the Liberty Sports unit (which was renamed DirecTV Sports Networks on November 19, 2009) were rebranded under the new name "Root Sports" on April 1, 2011.

DirecTV Sports Networks would be acquired by AT&T Inc. in 2015, as a byproduct of its acquisition of DirecTV. The renamed RSN unit, AT&T Sports Networks, would eventually announce on June 12, 2017, that it would rebrand most of its regional sports networks – with the exception of Root Sports Northwest, due to its ownership being majority controlled by the Seattle Mariners – under the AT&T SportsNet banner on July 14, 2017. AT&T Sports Networks continues to broadcast various sports magazine and documentary programs and select sporting events broadcast by Fox Sports Networks through an affiliation agreement with its former parent group; with the exception of AT&T SportsNet Southwest, which does not carry these programs due to the presence of a Fox Sports-owned subfeed network in its home market, these channels largely continue to carry the same local teams and national Bally Sports programs as they did with the Fox Sports Networks under FSN ownership.

In September 2018, AT&TSN was transferred to the WarnerMedia News & Sports division.

Current owned-and-operated networks

Spectrum Sports

Spectrum Sports is the collective name for a group of regional sports networks that are primarily owned and operated by Charter Communications through its acquisition of Time Warner Cable in May 2016.

Independent regional sports networks
The following is a list of regional sports channels that are not part of a larger national network:

College networks

Defunct networks

Canada

Sportsnet

Sportsnet (formerly known as CTV Sportsnet and Rogers Sportsnet) is owned by the Rogers Media division of Toronto-based Rogers Communications. Sportsnet carries all of the Toronto Blue Jays baseball games. Although it is considered a national channel with multiple feeds for regulatory purposes, in practice its four main channels act as a set of RSNs, albeit with a significant portion of common national programming. The four channels are:

Through the separate Sportsnet One licence, Rogers also operates three part-time regional "companion channels", which provide coverage of additional regional NHL broadcasts which are not able to air on Sportsnet's main regional channels: Sportsnet Flames, Sportsnet Oilers, and Sportsnet Vancouver Hockey.

Rogers is also a shareholder in Maple Leaf Sports & Entertainment (MLSE), which owns Leafs Nation Network, a channel devoted entirely to the Toronto Maple Leafs and its farm team, the Toronto Marlies (and is restricted to the Leafs' broadcast territory). MLSE also operates NBA TV Canada, which is distributed nationally but focuses much of its programming on the MLSE-owned Toronto Raptors and farm team Raptors 905.

TSN/RDS

On August 25, 2014, The Sports Network (TSN), another Canadian sports channel, split its singular national feed into four regional feeds in a manner similar to Sportsnet. These feeds are primarily used to broadcast regional NHL games, but may also be used to provide alternative and common national programming.

While each region has a primary TSN channel, due to overlaps in NHL territories it is possible in some parts of Ontario to access additional regional games from one non-primary channel. These situations are noted as they occur below.

Prior to the launch of these channels, regional NHL games whose rights were held by TSN (which, at that point, consisted solely of the Jets and Canadiens) were broadcast on special part-time channels exclusive to the team's television region.

Bell Media also owns Réseau des sports (RDS) and RDS2, French-language sports networks that are licensed to serve all of Canada, but in practice focus on the predominantly French-speaking province of Quebec (as there are relatively few francophones outside that province). Prior to the 2014–15 season, RDS could air Canadiens games on a national basis, as it was also the national French-language rightsholder of the National Hockey League in Canada. With Rogers' acquisition of the exclusive national media rights to the NHL, and its decision to sub-license French rights to Quebecor Media's TVA Sports, RDS and RDS2's coverage of the Canadiens and Senators are now restricted to parts of Eastern Ontario, Quebec and Atlantic Canada.

High definition
Nearly all regional sports networks broadcast all content in high definition as of 2016, with only the lowest-cost programming or high school sporting events produced locally for regional broadcast now only available in standard definition. Bally Sports and the NBC Sports Regional Networks owned-and-operated networks and affiliates maintain dedicated HD channels, which are used to broadcast both local and national HD programming, mainly game telecasts. All Bally Sports affiliates transmit HD programming in their native 720p resolution format; all NBC Sports Regional affiliates and independent channels transmit in 1080i.

Regional syndicators
Some telecasts (especially in U.S. college sports) are broadcast by ad-hoc syndicated packages, which can be picked up on a network of broadcasters that may consist of either individual over-the-air stations, regional sports networks, or a mixture of both.

Jefferson-Pilot Communications and Raycom Sports were well-known as syndicators of college sports on broadcast television, having previously held agreements with the Atlantic Coast Conference (ACC) and Southeastern Conference (SEC). By the late-2000's. both packages began to wind down after ESPN acquired the media rights to both conferences; ESPN initially maintained a syndicated package known as "SEC Network", while Raycom was given a sub-license to continue its syndication package (subsequently renamed "ACC Network"). Both packages ended when ESPN launched dedicated cable channels for both conferences.

ESPN was originally intended to focus on sports in Connecticut, but chose to broadcast nationally when it debuted in 1979 when it was discovered by the network's founders that it would be less expensive to broadcast nationwide on satellite as opposed to regionally through microwave transmission. ESPN formerly served as a college sports syndicator via ESPN Regional Television—formerly branded on-air as ESPN Plus, but later using conference-oriented brands such as SEC Network (not to be confused with the SEC Network cable channel which served as its de facto replacement), and Big East Network. The SEC Network package was a successor to the previous Raycom Sports-produced SEC package.

In 2014, television station owner Sinclair Broadcast Group established its own sports syndicator known as the American Sports Network (ASN), primarily syndicating broadcasts of college football and basketball from mid-major conferences (some of which were previously associated with ESPN Plus) to stations that it owns and operates. In 2015, Sinclair also acquired regional rights to Major League Soccer's Real Salt Lake, with ASN handling production and distribution of team telecasts within its designated market. ASN later began to operate a dedicated channel (which, in contrast to other sports channels, was distributed free-to-air via digital subchannels, and eventually subsumed its syndication of individual telecasts), and In 2017, was replaced by Stadium as part of a joint venture with Silver Chalice—which carries a larger focus on streaming distribution alongside digital subchannels.

See also
 Sports channel
 Broadcasting of sports events

References

External links
 Kaiser's Blog – Info on RSN history and some regions.

Sports television in the United States
Sports television in Canada
Cable television in the United States
Cable television in Canada